Kuchu (also Romanized as Kūchū; also known as Gāchū, Kuchau, Kūcheh, Kūchow, and Kūshū) is a village in Talang Rural District, Talang District, Qasr-e Qand County, Sistan and Baluchestan Province, Iran. At the 2006 census, its population was 241, in 51 families.

References 

Populated places in Qasr-e Qand County